Barry Callaghan (born 30 November 1986, in Glasgow) is a Scottish footballer who played as a midfielder. He played for Dundee United and Brechin City, and also for Queen of the South on loan.

Career
Callaghan began his career with Dundee United and was given his only senior appearance for the club by then-manager Ian McCall in March 2005, as a substitute against Aberdeen. In August 2006, Callaghan joined Queen of the South, where McCall was now manager, on a six-month loan transfer. Dundee United announced that he, along with Gregg Burnett, would be leaving at the end of the 2006–07 season. Callaghan signed for Brechin in June 2007 but was released in May 2008, having made the last of his four appearances in September 2007.

Career statistics

References

External links
 

1986 births
Footballers from Glasgow
Living people
Scottish footballers
Dundee United F.C. players
Queen of the South F.C. players
Brechin City F.C. players
Scottish Premier League players
Scottish Football League players
Association football midfielders